Abolitionism is the movement to end human slavery.

Abolitionism may also refer to:
 Abolitionism (animal rights), a movement to end the property status of animals
 Abolitionism (copyright/patent), a movement to abolish state granted monopolies over intellectual works
 Abolitionism (prostitution), a movement to abolish state regulation of prostitution, seen as a form of slavery of women
 Abolitionism (capital punishment), a movement to abolish the death penalty within the capital punishment debate
Abolitionism (transhumanism), a current within the transhumanist movement, which seeks to abolish all pain and suffering in all sentient beings
 Gender abolitionism (in gender studies, radical feminism or postgenderism), a movement to abolish gender
 Market abolitionism, a belief that the market, in the economic sense, should be eliminated from society
 Prison abolition, a movement to end incarceration as a means to address harm
Border abolitionism, a movement to abolish borders between countries
 Total abolition, a political philosophy also known as veganarchism (veganism and anarchism)
 Police abolition movement
 Abortion abolitionism, a movement to abolish abortion

See also
Abolition (disambiguation)